Pierre-Gilles Veber (1896-1968) was a French journalist and screenwriter. He was the son of the playwright Pierre Veber and the novelist Catherine Agadjanian, who wrote under the pseudonym Georgette Paul. His own son Francis Veber also became a screenwriter, and his granddaughter Sophie Audouin-Mamikonian is a celebrated young adult author.

Selected filmography
 Fanfan la Tulipe (1925)
 The Unknown Singer (1931)
 The Duke of Reichstadt (1931)
 The Eaglet (1931)
 A Son from America (1932)
 Flying Gold (1932)

References

Bibliography 
 Klossner, Michael. The Europe of 1500-1815 on Film and Television: A Worldwide Filmography of Over 2550 Works, 1895 Through 2000. McFarland, 2002.

External links 
 

1896 births
1968 deaths
20th-century French screenwriters
20th-century French journalists